GTPase-activating Rap/Ran-GAP domain-like 1 is an enzyme that in humans is encoded by the RALGAPA1 gene.

References

Further reading